Patrick James Mulligan (born ) was a rugby union player who represented Australia.

Mulligan, a centre, and played in 1 international match for Australia, against the New Zealand XV at Sydney, on 13 June 1925.

References

Australian rugby union players
Australia international rugby union players
Year of birth uncertain
Rugby union centres